Events from the year 1981 in Sweden

Incumbents
 Monarch – Carl XVI Gustaf
 Prime Minister – Thorbjörn Fälldin

Events

27 October – The "Whiskey on the rocks" incident, when the Soviet submarine S-363 ran aground on the south coast of Sweden.
7 November – The Swedish Floorball Federation is founded in Sala.

Births
 3 January – Kajsa Bergström, curler
 12 January – Niklas Kronwall, ice hockey player
 18 March – Lina Andersson, cross country skier
 25 April – Anja Pärson, skier
 10 May – Kristian Svensson, handball player and handball coach

Deaths

 13 May – Gustaf Dyrssen, military officer (born 1891)
 23 June – Zarah Leander, actress and singer (born 1907)
 5 October – Helge Gustafsson, gymnast (born 1900)

References

 
Sweden
Years of the 20th century in Sweden